Vladimir Ivanovich Smirnov (10 June 1887 – 11 February 1974) was a mathematician who made significant contributions in both pure and applied mathematics, and also in the history of mathematics.

Smirnov worked on diverse areas of mathematics, such as complex functions and conjugate functions in Euclidean spaces. In the applied field his work includes the propagation of waves in elastic media with plane boundaries (with Sergei Sobolev) and the oscillations of elastic spheres.
His pioneering approach to solving the initial-boundary value problem to the wave equation formed the basis of the spacetime triangle diagram (STTD) technique for wave motion developed by his follower Victor Borisov (also known as the Smirnov method of incomplete separation of variables).

Smirnov was a Ph.D. student of Vladimir Steklov. Among his notable students were Sergei Sobolev, Solomon Mikhlin and Nobel prize winner Leonid Kantorovich.

Smirnov is also widely known among students for his five volume series (in seven books) A Course in Higher Mathematics (Курс высшей математики) (the first volume was written jointly with Jacob Tamarkin).

References

External links

 
 

1887 births
1974 deaths

Soviet mathematicians
Mathematicians from Saint Petersburg
Saint Petersburg State University alumni
Academic staff of Perm State University
Full Members of the USSR Academy of Sciences